Silke Huettler is a German Paralympic judoka. In 2004, she won the silver medal in the women's 63 kg event at the 2004 Summer Paralympics held in Athens, Greece. In the final, she lost against Madina Kazakova of Russia.

References 

Living people
Year of birth missing (living people)
Place of birth missing (living people)
German female judoka
Paralympic judoka of Germany
Paralympic silver medalists for Germany
Paralympic medalists in judo
Judoka at the 2004 Summer Paralympics
Medalists at the 2004 Summer Paralympics
21st-century German women